This list of the tallest buildings in North America ranks skyscrapers in order by height. The United States is considered the birthplace of the skyscraper, with the world's first skyscraper built in Chicago in 1885. Since then, the United States has been home to some of the world's tallest skyscrapers, with the tallest in New York City and Chicago. Eleven buildings in North America (all in the United States) have held the title of tallest building in the world, with 9 in New York City. Canada and Mexico have also seen areas of skyscraper building, especially in Toronto, Calgary, Mexico City and Monterrey. Additionally, Panama City has emerged as a hotbed of skyscraper building activity and currently lists a total of 49 buildings over 150 meters in height.

List 
This list ranks completed and topped-out buildings in North America that stand at least 235 meters (771 ft.) tall, based on standard height measurement which includes spires and architectural details. An equal sign (=) following a rank indicates the same height between two or more buildings. The "Year" column indicates the year in which a building was completed. This list includes Central America. No countries in the Caribbean have buildings taller than 200 meters.

Of the 120 buildings in this list, 38 (33%) are in New York City. A further 15 are in Chicago, while Canada has the largest number of buildings outside of the United States at 10 (6 being in Toronto). American cities contain the majority of buildings on the list, having 92 buildings over 235 meters in height.

See also 
 List of tallest buildings
 List of tallest buildings in the United States
 List of tallest buildings in Mexico
 List of tallest buildings in Canada
 List of tallest buildings in Panama
 List of tallest buildings in Central America

References 

 
Tallest buildings